The 1992 Flores earthquake and tsunami occurred on December 12 on the island of Flores in Indonesia. With a magnitude of 7.8 and a maximum Mercalli intensity of VIII (Severe), it was the largest and also the deadliest earthquake in 1992 and in the Lesser Sunda Islands region. The earthquake was caused by slip on the Flores Thrust fault. This fault dips to the south underneath Flores Island. The epicenters of most earthquakes on the Flores Thrust are on Flores island.

Description
The quake hit at 13:29:26 WITA and was followed by several serious aftershocks. At least 2,500 people were killed or missing near Flores, including 1,490 at Maumere and 700 on Babi. More than 500 people were injured and 90,000 were left homeless. Nineteen people were killed and 130 houses were destroyed on Kalaotoa. Damage was assessed at exceeding US$100 million. Approximately 90% of the buildings were destroyed at Maumere, the hardest hit town, by the earthquake and ensuing tsunami while 50% to 80% of the structures on Flores were damaged or destroyed. Electricity in the general area and the port of Maumere was shut down. Maumere's hospital was completely destroyed, and patients were treated in tents. Damage also occurred on Sumba and Alor.

Tsunami
The tsunami on Flores ran inland as far as 300 meters with wave heights as high as 25 meters.

Relief efforts
The Indonesian government sent rescue and relief missions to earthquake-stricken areas and declared the earthquake a national disaster. The Indonesian air force provided assistance, mostly transporting medicine and clothing. Malaria and influenza rose significantly after the disaster. Babi Island survivors were evacuated since all the houses on the island were demolished. International relief efforts were hindered by the onset of the rainy season.

The Indonesian Government also requested assistance from the international community.  Agencies such as the Asian Development Bank in Asia along with the World Bank, the Australian Agency for International Development, the Japanese Overseas Cooperation Fund, and others, made a coordinated effort to support reconstruction. Each agency concentrated on sectors and locations in which it had experience.

See also
List of earthquakes in 1992
List of earthquakes in Indonesia
5 August 2018 Lombok earthquake

References

External links

Flores
1992 tsunamis
Earthquakes in Indonesia
Geography of Flores Island (Indonesia)
1992 in Indonesia
Tsunamis in Indonesia
December 1992 events in Asia
East Nusa Tenggara
1992 disasters in Indonesia